The Crepori River is a river of Pará state in north-central Brazil. It is a tributary of the Tapajós.

The river flows through the Tapajós-Xingu moist forests ecoregion.
The river basin includes part of the  Rio Novo National Park, a conservation unit created in 2006.

See also
List of rivers of Pará

References

Rivers of Pará